Bekorobo is a town and commune in Madagascar. It belongs to the district of Betroka, which is a part of Anosy Region. The population of the commune was estimated to be approximately 6,000 in 2001 commune census.

Only primary schooling is available. The majority 75% of the population of the commune are farmers, while an additional 20% receives their livelihood from raising livestock. The most important crops are rice and onions, while other important agricultural products are peanuts and cassava. Services provide employment for 5% of the population.

References and notes 

Populated places in Anosy